Alistair Hicks (born 1 August 1956) is a writer and art curator. He was Senior Curator at Deutsche Bank for 20 years and is an international curator.

Life and work

Education
Hicks was educated at Eton College, and subsequently at the University of St Andrews, Scotland, graduating in 1978 with an Art History MA. Hicks then continued to study at Emory University, Georgia, U.S. to read Art and Business.

Career

Hicks is the author of The Global Art Compass: New Directions in 21st Century Art, a survey of 21st century art.  Hicks has curated several exhibitions, including Raymond Pettibon and Marko Maetamm at Kumu, Art Museum of Estonia and of the Moscow Conceptualist Nikita Alexeev at Narrative Projects in London. Hicks is author of several publications on contemporary art, including The School of London, New British Art in the Saatchi Collection and Art Works: Deutsche Bank Collection Group Head Office, Frankfurt.

Hicks writes as a critic and commentator for The Financial Times, Apollo Magazine and Frieze Magazine. He was a contributor to The Spectator, Vogue and The Times.

 Christie's Auction House, 1981 – 1982
 Antiques Across the World, editor, 1982 – 1985
 Antique, editor, 1985 – 1996
 Deutsche Bank, 1996 – 2016

Personal life

Hicks lives in London with his wife and has two daughters.

List of Publications

References

1956 births
Living people
Alumni of the University of St Andrews
Emory University alumni
People educated at Eton College
English non-fiction writers
British art curators